Mimacmocera coerulea is a species of beetle in the family Cerambycidae, and the only species in the genus Mimacmocera. It was described by Breuning in 1960.

References

Acmocerini
Beetles described in 1960
Monotypic beetle genera
Taxa named by Stephan von Breuning (entomologist)